The Hahnberg is a 685.3 m high (above sea level) slightly undulatory tableland located in the Thuringian Highland, Thuringia (Germany). 

It is located close to the municipality of Lichte and the Leibis-Lichte Dam in the  Saalfeld-Rudolstadt district in the Thuringian Forest Nature Park. The section of the Rennsteig walkway between Neuhaus am Rennweg, Piesau, and Spechtsbrunn runs close to the Hahnberg plateau.

See also
 List of Mountains and Elevations of Thuringia

Mountains of Thuringia
Thuringian Forest
Lichte